The Los Angeles Guerrillas are an American professional Call of Duty League (CDL) esports team based in Los Angeles. Los Angeles Guerrillas is owned by Kroenke Sports & Entertainment.

History 
On August 20, 2019, Activision Blizzard announced that Kroenke Sports & Entertainment had purchased one of the two new franchise slots for the Call of Duty League. According to ESPN, the publisher was looking to sell slots for approximately $25 million per team. On October 18, 2019, branding was revealed as the Los Angeles Guerrillas. The Guerrillas won their first major in franchise history during Major Two of the 2022 Call of Duty League.

Current roster

References

External links
 

Venture capital-funded esports teams
Esports teams based in Los Angeles
Call of Duty League teams
Esports teams established in 2019